Planetizen is a planning-related news website and e-learning platform based in Los Angeles, California. It features user-submitted and editor-evaluated news and weekly user-contributed op-eds about urban planning and several related fields. The website also publishes an annual list of the top 10 books in the field published during the current year, and a directory and ranking of graduate-level education in the field of urban planning.

The name of the website is a concatenation of Plan, as in the word, planning, and Netizen, a portmanteau of Internet and citizen. The website self-reports that it is visited by 1.5 million unique visitors each year.

In 2006, the website also started publishing books, including the first urban planning book for children, Where Things Are, From Near to Far, published in 2008 by Planetizen Press. This book was reviewed by The New York Times. Their 2007 book "Planetizen's Contemporary Debates in Urban Planning", a collection of brief essays published by Island Press, received positive reviews.

Contributions
Planetizen introduced a much-needed broader perspective on city planning in the US, which very often extends into international practice as well. Coming out of the very formal car-oriented planning philosophy and practice following the Second World War, American urbanism risked becoming a dinosaur as it missed all the exciting New Urbanist practices being implemented. The great value of Planetizen was to juxtapose ALL planning practice and let readers judge the effectiveness of each idea. Coming as it did in the internet age, it provided, and continues to provide, an extremely useful central location for urbanists and planners to follow what is happening around the world. More than any other site, Planetizen is a clearing house of planning ideas, and its inclusivity without any ideological prejudice is both refreshing and invaluable.

Innovations and debates

Suburban sprawl
The major problem in developed economies is urban sprawl and its energy-devouring urban morphology. Planetizen has broadly championed the New Urbanist solutions while juxtaposing a variety of alternatives and criticisms. This interplay lays the groundwork for facing a difficult problem. Debate on Planetizen juxtaposes practical concerns of developers and government entities with the need for more sustainable urban fabric. Developers who build Sprawl are being educated towards new strategies for a more livable suburbia.

Informal settlements
In the Developing World, the major problem facing both economies and governments lies in owner-built settlements, favelas, villas miserias, gecekondu, or slums by any other name. Here the debate is more difficult to access, because for a long time, the problems and solutions found in informal settlements have been either ignored or misinterpreted by mainstream planners. Solutions to this exponentially growing problem are not obvious. Planetizen has commendably brought attention to this other side of urbanism, so often ignored by the urban planning schools. For example, it sponsored a discussion on the Bombay slum Dharavi, which brought the topic of slum clearance versus upgrading to worldwide attention.

Skyscrapers/tall buildings
World economies and major construction companies are driven in part by building megaprojects, the most prominent component of which is one or more skyscrapers. Planetizen has opened up the debate on skyscrapers more than once. A city has to balance the drive to build high, using high-tech, with the theoretical objections that skyscrapers drain the resources and energy from the region in which they are implanted. New skyscrapers are claimed to be eco-sustainable, but those claims have as many critics as they have proponents. Again, there is a need for a broad debate, and Planetizen contains many different and dissenting viewpoints on the question of skyscrapers as a viable building typology.

Planning Graduate Program Rankings

Planetizen has ranked planning graduate programs in the United States through six editions of its Guide to Urban Planning Graduate Programs, and has published the top 10 ranks on its website.

Criticism
Planetizen is often criticized for running news stories or user-contributed op-eds that are critical of current urban planning practices. Planetizen is also criticized by some urban planning educators in higher education for ranking graduate-level urban planning programs in the Guide to Graduate Urban Planning Education.

Timeline
 February 2000 - Planetizen is created
 August 2000 - First contributed op-ed, by Anthony Downs
 February 2001 - Site recognized with an award for use of technology by the American Planning Association
 September 2001 - James Howard Kunstler and Nikos A. Salingaros call for the end of skyscrapers in response to September 11 attacks, in an article on Planetizen, The End of Tall Buildings
 November 2002 - First annual review of top 10 books in the field of urban planning
 February 2005 - Planetizen moves to the Drupal web publishing platform and documents the migration in an article for Linux Journal.
 March 2006 - Planetizen associate editor Nate Berg begins weekly podcast about weekly urban planning issues
 June 2006 - Planetizen Press publishes first ranking of graduate-level urban planning programs
 May 2008 - Planetizen Press publishes second ranking of graduate-level urban planning programs
 October 2009 - Planetizen publishes a list of the top 100 urban thinkers, as voted on by visitors to the website
 April 2011 - Planetizen publishes a list of the top 25 thinkers in urban planning and technology
 May 2011 - Planetizen publishes 2012 ranking of graduate-level urban planning] programs
 October 2014 - Planetizen publishes 2015 ranking of graduate-level urban planning programs
 February 2015 - Planetizen launches the first video courses focused on educating urban planners
 June 2017 - Planetizen publishes 4th Edition ranking of graduate-level urban planning programs
 October 2017 - Planetizen publishes a list of the 100  most influential urbanists.
 May 2018 - Planetizen publishes Urban Design for Planners by Emily Talen.

Editors
The site was created in February 2000 by co-editors in chief Abhijeet Chavan and Chris Steins. In 2005 David Gest was appointed the first managing editor. Subsequent managing editors have included Christian Peralta Madera (2006), Timothy Halbur (2008), Jonathan Nettler, AICP (2012) and James Brasuell (2014).

Planetizen Press
Planetizen Press is the publishing arm of Planetizen, and has published several print books.

Planetizen Guide to Graduate Urban Planning Programs, 4th Edition. Published by Planetizen Press (2014).
Unsprawl: Remixing Spaces as Places. Published by Planetizen Press (2013).
Planetizen 2012 Guide to Graduate Urban Planning Programs. Published by Planetizen Press (May, 2011).
Insider's Guide to Careers in Urban Planning. Published by Planetizen Press (November, 2009).
Where Things Are, from Near to Far: A Children's book about urban planning. Published by Planetizen Press (December, 2008).
Planetizen 2009 Guide to Graduate Urban Planning Programs. Published by Planetizen Press (May, 2008).
Planetizen 2007 Guide to Graduate Urban Planning Programs. Published by Planetizen Press (June, 2006).

References

External links
 Planetizen front page

American news websites
Internet properties established in 2000
Academic works about urban studies and planning
Sustainable transport pioneers
New Urbanism
Transport websites